Birla Institute of Technology, Off Campus Jaipur  (abbreviated BIT Jaipur or BIT Mesra, Off Campus Jaipur) is an educational centre offering undergraduate and postgraduate courses located in Jaipur, Rajasthan, India. It functions under the academic guidance of the parent university Birla Institute of Technology, Mesra, Ranchi in terms of the academic curriculum, calendar as well as the semester examinations.

History 
 
The Birla Institute of Technology, Mesra, Jaipur Campus was established in 1995 in the campus of the Birla Institute of Scientific Research (BISR). 
It started by offering PG level programmes in computer science and computer applications. Since then the range of programmes as well as the facilities have expanded to offer a wide range of academic programmes both UG & PG level.

Academic programmes 

Undergraduate Programme
 B.Tech. in Computer Science
 B.Tech. in Electronics & Communication Engineering
 B.Tech. in Electrical & Electronics Engineering
 B.Sc. (Animation & Multimedia)
 BCA
 BBA

 Postgraduate Programme 
 MBA
 MCA
 Master In Animation Design
 Integrated MCA

 Doctoral (Ph.D.) Programme 
 Computer Science and Engineering
 Electrical & Electronics Engineering
 Management Studies
 Physics
 Chemistry
 Mathematics
 Animation and Multimedia

Admissions 
 B.Tech.: Through merit list based on CRL Rank in JEE Main conducted by CBSE, New Delhi.
 B.Sc.(Animation & Multimedia): Based on marks obtained in the required subject in Class XII / Intermediate / equivalent qualifying examination and performance in Creative Aptitude Test & Interview. Weightage of marks considered in merit list is (50%+40%+10%) respectively.
 BCA: On the basis of marks obtained by the candidates in Class XII / Intermediate / equivalent qualifying examination.
 BBA: On the basis of marks obtained by the candidates in Class XII / Intermediate / equivalent qualifying examination.
 MCA: Based on Online Entrance Exam followed by Counselling.

Student life

Annual festivals 
BIT Mesra, Jaipur campus has various active clubs and committees for organisation of events and festivals. Major festivals of the campus are:-

Techvibes
It is the technical festival of the BIT Jaipur. It is a two-day inter college event being organised in the Spring Semester. Events include Most Famous HACKATHON, Coding Events sponsored by Topcoder and CSI, Robotic events, Technical Quizzes and Seminars, DJ and EDM Nites. In the Year 2014 Raeth Band of Pakistan performed during the Techvibes.

 Cavorts 
It is an Inter College Sports Event held every year in the Monsoon semester. The events include Cricket, Basketball, Volleyball, Kho Kho, Kabbaddi, Badminton, Chess among others.

 Vibrations 
It is the Cultural Fest event of the Jaipur Campus. Held every year in the Spring Semester, The fest consists of Dance Competitions, BIT Idol, War of the Bands, Pro Nite, DJ Nites and many off-stage events. Famous musicians have participated in this festival which include Mohit Gaur India's Raw Star Finalist, Rudraksh Band, DJ Akshay Sehgal, Bollywood Singer Aman Trikha  etc.

 Dandiya Night 
Dandiya Raas is the traditional folk dance form of Gujarat, it is performed depicting scenes of Holi, and lila of Krishna and Radha.  It is the featured dance of Navratri evenings in Western India. During Navratri festival, BIT Mesra, Jaipur campus organises Dandiya Nights for students for better understanding of different cultures.

Social cause 
On 8 March 2014 The Students of BIT Mesra, Jaipur Campus have organized a marathon "Run for Women's Pride" to mark International Women's Day. The event was co-sponsored by TimesPro. The marathon was organized to spread awareness about development of women in the country through education. About 500 students, people from different walks of life and TimesPro employees took part in it.

Clubs and societies 
BIT Jaipur has many active clubs & societies which gives students the opportunity to showcase their talents in various extra Co Curricular activities.

 Technical & Management Society
 Cultural Society
 Sports Club
 Photographic Society
 Robotics Club
 Design Team
 Programming Club, BIT Jaipur
 Computer Society of India, BIT Jaipur
 IETE, BIT Jaipur
 Entrepreneurship Cell, BIT Jaipur
 Quizophillic, The Quizzing Club

See also 
 BIT Mesra
 Birla Institute of Technology International Centre
 Birla Institute of Technology – Science and Technology Entrepreneurs' Park
 CK Birla Group

References

External links
 Official website

J
Engineering colleges in Jaipur
Science and technology in Jaipur
Educational institutions established in 1995
1995 establishments in Rajasthan